Carlos Manuel Almánzar Girón (born November 6, 1973) is a Dominican former professional baseball pitcher. He played in Major League Baseball (MLB) for the Toronto Blue Jays, San Diego Padres, New York Yankees, Cincinnati Reds, and Texas Rangers. He has also pitched in the minor leagues for the Atlanta Braves and Boston Red Sox.

Career
Almanzar was involved in an infamous incident involving some Rangers teammates and Oakland Athletics fans on September 13, that ultimately resulted in teammate Frank Francisco throwing a chair into the stands and hitting a fan, causing her to suffer a cut. He was suspended briefly for the incident.

On October 4, Almanzar, who had missed most of the 2005 season due to a torn elbow ligament that required Tommy John surgery to repair, was suspended for 10 days by MLB authorities for failing a steroids test.  He indicated that he would appeal the suspension.

In , Almanzar did not play for any team during the regular season, but did play for Leones del Escogido in the Dominican Winter League where he was 2–0 with a 1.80 ERA after 6 appearances.

Personal life
Almanzar's son, Michael Almanzar, is also professional baseball player.

See also

List of sportspeople sanctioned for doping offences

References

External links

1973 births
Living people
Baseball players suspended for drug offenses
Cincinnati Reds players
Columbus Clippers players
Dominican Republic expatriate baseball players in Canada
Dominican Republic expatriate baseball players in the United States
Dominican Republic sportspeople in doping cases
Gulf Coast Red Sox players
Knoxville Smokies players
Las Vegas Stars (baseball) players
Louisville Bats players
Major League Baseball pitchers
Major League Baseball players from the Dominican Republic
Medicine Hat Blue Jays players
Mississippi Braves players
New York Yankees players
Newark Bears players
People from Santiago de los Caballeros
Portland Sea Dogs players
Richmond Braves players
San Diego Padres players
Syracuse SkyChiefs players
Texas Rangers players
Toronto Blue Jays players
Azucareros del Este players
Leones del Escogido players